Thomas Bradshaw is an American playwright whose work has been extensively reviewed. He is the recipient of PEN/Laura Pels International Foundation for Theater Award as the Emerging American Playwright and of the Foundation for Contemporary Arts Grants to Artists award (2012).

Plays 
 The Seagull/Woodstock, NY (2023)
 Thomas & Sally (2017)
 Fulfillment (2015)
 Intimacy (2014)
 Job (2012)
 Burning (2011)
 Mary (2011)
 The Bereaved (2009)
 Southern Promises (2008)
 Purity (2007)
 Prophet (2005)

Reactions 

Bradshaw's work Thomas & Sally was met with protests because the play debates whether Thomas Jefferson and Sally Hemings could have been in love. Protestors argue that there is no room for debate because Hemings was Jefferson's slave.

References 

Living people
American male dramatists and playwrights
African-American dramatists and playwrights
21st-century American dramatists and playwrights
21st-century American male writers
1980 births
Bard College alumni
Brooklyn College alumni
Brooklyn College faculty
Northwestern University faculty
21st-century African-American writers
20th-century African-American people
African-American male writers